Retrofit Films is a production company located in Los Angeles, California, that develops and produces digital media and entertainment.

History
Retrofit Films was founded by Chris Hanada and Tanner Kling in 2004. Starting in 2006, the company began creating companion Web series for television shows. After graduating from Loyola Marymount University’s film school, Hanada and Kling began their careers working at Tom Cruise and Paula Wagner’s C/W Productions on films such as Mission: Impossible 2 and Vanilla Sky, where they contributed to script and story development, research, production and promotion. Hanada and Kling are members of the Producers Guild of America.

Overview

Television and new media
Retrofit Films produces new media projects for television networks, movie studios and advertising brands, including animated and live-action web series, DVD featurettes, mobisodes and gameisodes.

The company created three Web series for NBC's Heroes, entitled Going Postal, The Recruit and Nowhere Man, featuring characters from the series. The Recruit was nominated for two 2009 Webby Awards. They also created Kara & The Chronicles of Krypton, an animated Web series for The CW Network's's Smallville; the 4-episode companion Web series A Darker Truth for The CW's Vampire Diaries; a Web series for Gossip Girl entitled Gossip Girl: Real New York Stories Revealed; and a companion Web series for NBC's My Own Worst Enemy called Conspiracy Theory. Other projects include a 13-part series of 3-minute "appisodes" for the iPhone, iPad and iPod Touch for the INHouse app for Fox's House in 2010, and 10 on-air/Web Sprint New Media Episodes in 2009 for Heroes entitled Slow Burn. In 2012, Retrofit worked with Marvel on Marvel Mash-Up, a series of interstitials taking footage from classic Marvel animated series and re-editing them in a humorous way. They originally aired on Disney XD and online. In 2015, Retrofit produced the 6-chapter Web series Dark Matters, a prequel to the television miniseries Heroes Reborn, with all six chapters directed by Kling. In 2016, the company executive produced This Isn't Working, a five-part short-form digital series starring Lisa Schwartz, and in 2017 executive produced The Off Season, a five-part short-form digital series starring Robert Belushi and Erica Rhodes, both for ABC.

The company's client list includes NBCUniversal, Sprint, Mindshare, Ogilvy & Mather, Edelman, The CW, ABC, Warner Bros., Marvel, DreamWorks and AOL.

Publishing division
In 2015, Retrofit Films launched a science fiction publishing division, Retrofit Publishing, which was renamed Axiomatic Publishing in 2016. In 2015, Retrofit Publishing put out First Fleet, a collection of serialized novellas by Stephen Case; and The Rewind Files, playwright Claire Willett's debut novel.

Awards
 The Recruit
 Winner of Two People's Voice Webby Awards: People's Voice, Online Film & Video, Best Series, 2009; People's Voice, Online Film & Video, Best Individual Episode, 2009
 Winner of Silver Telly Award: Online Video, 2009
 Conspiracy Theory
 Winner of Bronze Telly Award: Online Entertainment, 2009
 Nurse Jeffrey: Bitch Tapes
 Nominee, Golden Reel Award: Best Sound Editing – Computer Episodic Entertainment, 2011
 Insidious: Spectral Sightings
 Nominee, Golden Reel Award: Best Sound Editing – Computer Episodic Entertainment, 2014
 Heroes Reborn: Dark Matters – "Chapter Two: Phoebe"
 Winner, Writers Guild Award: Adapted Short Form New Media, 2016
 Agents of S.H.I.E.L.D.: Academy
 Nominee, Producers Guild of America Award for Outstanding Digital Series, 2016

Notable Projects

References

External links
 
 Axiomatic Publishing website
 Retrofit Films on IMDb

Film production companies of the United States
Digital media organizations
Entertainment companies based in California
Companies based in Los Angeles
Entertainment companies established in 2004
2004 establishments in California